Heathkit is the brand name of kits and other electronic products produced and marketed by the Heath Company. The products over the decades have included electronic test equipment, high fidelity home audio equipment, television receivers, amateur radio equipment, robots, electronic ignition conversion modules for early model cars with point style ignitions, and the influential Heath H-8, H-89, and H-11 hobbyist computers, which were sold in kit form for assembly by the purchaser.

Heathkit manufactured electronic kits from 1947 until 1992. After closing that business, the Heath Company continued with its products for education, and motion-sensor lighting controls. The lighting control business was sold around 2000. The company announced in 2011 that they were reentering the kit business after a 20-year hiatus but then filed for bankruptcy in 2012, and under new ownership began restructuring in 2013. , the company has a live website with newly designed products, services, vintage kits, and replacement parts for sale.

Founding 
The Heath Company was founded as an aircraft company in 1911 by Edward Bayard Heath with the purchase of Bates Aeroplane Co, soon renamed to E.B. Heath Aerial Vehicle Co. Starting in 1926 it sold a light aircraft, the Heath Parasol, in kit form. Heath died during a 1931 test flight. The company reorganized and moved from Chicago to Niles, Michigan. 

In 1935, Howard Anthony purchased the then-bankrupt Heath Company, and focused on selling accessories for small aircraft. After World War II, Anthony decided that entering the electronics industry was a good idea, and bought a large stock of surplus wartime electronic parts with the intention of building kits with them. In 1947, Heath introduced its first electronic kit, the O1 oscilloscope with 5 inch diameter cathode ray tube display (CRT) that sold for US$39.50 – the price was unbeatable at the time, and the oscilloscope went on to be a huge seller.

Heathkit product concept 

After the success of the oscilloscope kit, Heath went on to produce dozens of Heathkit products. Heathkits were influential in shaping two generations of electronic hobbyists. The Heathkit sales premise was that by investing the time to assemble a Heathkit, the purchasers could build something comparable to a factory-built product at a significantly lower cash cost and, if it malfunctioned, could repair it themselves.  During those decades, the premise was basically valid.

Commercial factory-built electronic products were constructed from generic, discrete components such as vacuum tubes, tube sockets, capacitors, inductors, and resistors, mostly hand-wired and assembled using point-to-point construction technology. The home kit-builder could perform these labor-intensive assembly tasks himself, and if careful, attain at least the same standard of quality. In the case of Heathkit's most expensive product at the time, the Thomas electronic organ, building the kit version represented substantial savings.

One category in which Heathkit enjoyed great popularity was amateur radio. Ham radio operators had frequently been forced to build their equipment from scratch before the advent of kits, with the difficulty of procuring all the parts separately and relying on often-experimental designs. Kits brought the convenience of all parts being supplied together, with the assurance of a predictable finished product; many Heathkit model numbers became well known in the ham radio community. The HW-101 HF transceiver became so ubiquitous that even today the "Hot Water One-Oh-One" can be found in use, or purchased as used equipment at hamfests, decades after it went out of production.

In the case of electronic test equipment, Heathkits often filled a low-end entry-level niche, giving hobbyists access at an affordable price.

The instruction books were regarded as among the best in the kit industry, being models of clarity, beginning with basic lessons on soldering technique, and proceeding with explicit step-by-step directions, illustrated with numerous line drawings; the drawings could be folded out to be visible next to the relevant text (which might be bound several pages away) and were aligned with the assembler's viewpoint. Also in view was a checkbox to mark with a pencil as each task was accomplished. The instructions usually included complete schematic diagrams, block diagrams depicting different subsystems and their interconnections, and a "Theory of Operation" section that explained the basic function of each section of the electronics.

Heathkits as education

No knowledge of electronics was needed to assemble a Heathkit. The assembly process itself did not teach much about electronics, but provided a great deal of what could have been called basic "electronics literacy", such as the ability to identify tube pin numbers or to read a resistor color code.  Many hobbyists began by assembling Heathkits, became familiar with the appearance of components like capacitors, transformers, resistors, and tubes, and were motivated to understand just what these components actually did. For those builders who had a deeper knowledge of electronics (or for those who wanted to be able to troubleshoot/repair the product in the future), the assembly manuals usually included a detailed "Theory of Operation" chapter, which explained the functioning of the kit's circuitry, section by section. 

Heath developed a business relationship with electronics correspondence schools (e.g., NRI and Bell & Howell), and supplied electronic kits to be assembled as part of their courses, with the schools basing their texts and lessons around the kits. In the 1960s, Heathkit marketed a line of its electronic instruments which had been modified for use in teaching physics at the high school (Physical Science Study Committee, PSSC) and college levels (Berkeley Physics Course).

Heathkits could teach deeper lessons. "The kits taught Steve Jobs that products were manifestations of human ingenuity, not magical objects dropped from the sky", writes a business author, who goes on to quote Jobs as saying "It gave a tremendous level of self-confidence, that through exploration and learning one could understand seemingly very complex things in one's environment."

Diversification 

After the death of Howard Anthony in a 1954 airplane crash, his widow sold the company to Daystrom Company, a management holding company that also owned several other electronics companies. Daystrom was absorbed by oilfield service company Schlumberger Limited in 1962, and the Daystrom/Schlumberger days were to be among Heathkit's most successful. 

Those years saw some "firsts" in the general consumer market. The early 1960s saw the introduction of the AA-100 integrated amplifier. The early 1970s saw Heath introduce the AJ-1510, an FM tuner using digital synthesis, the GC-1005 digital clock, and the GR-2000 color television set. In 1974, Heathkit started "Heathkit Educational Systems", which expanded their manuals into general electronics and computer training materials. Heathkit also expanded their expertise into digital and, eventually, computerized equipment, producing among other things digital clocks and weather stations with the new technology.

Kits were compiled in small batches mostly by hand, using roller conveyor lines. These lines were put up and taken down as needed. Some kits were sold completely "assembled and tested" in the factory. These models were differentiated with a "W" suffix after the model number, indicating that they were factory-wired.

For much of Heathkit's history, there were competitors. In electronic kits: Allied Radio, an electronic parts supply house, had its KnightKits, Lafayette Radio offered some kits, Radio Shack made a few forays into this market with its Archerkit line, Dynaco made its audio products available in kit form (Dynakits), as did H. H. Scott, Inc., Fisher, and Eico; and later such companies as Southwest Technical Products and the David Hafler Company.

Personal computers 

Before entering the burgeoning home computer market, Heathkit marketed and sold microprocessor-based systems aimed at learning about this technology. The ET-3400, for example, was released in 1976 and was based on the Motorola 6800 microprocessor. This system included 256 bytes of RAM, a 1k monitor in ROM, and a keypad for easy entry and modification of programs. Despite being a small trainer kit, it was powerful and flexible enough to be used in rudimentary control systems.

In 1978, Heathkit introduced the Heathkit H8 home computer. The H8 was very successful, as were the H19 and H29 terminals, and the H89 "All in One" computer. The H8 and H89 ran the Heathkit custom operating system HDOS as well as the popular CP/M operating system. The H89 contained two Zilog Z80 8-bit processors, one for the computer and one for the built-in H-19 terminal. The H11, a low-end DEC LSI-11 16-bit computer, was less successful, probably because it was substantially more expensive than the 8-bit computer line.

Seeing the potential in personal computers, Zenith Radio Company bought Heath Company from Schlumberger in 1979 for $63 million, renaming the computer division Zenith Data Systems (ZDS). Zenith purchased Heath for the flexible assembly line infrastructure at the nearby St. Joseph facility as well as the R&D assets.

Heath/Zenith was in the vanguard of companies to start selling personal computers to small businesses. The H-89 kit was re-branded as the Zenith Z-89/Z-90, an assembled all in one system with a monitor and a floppy disk drive. They had agreements with Peachtree Software to sell a customized "turn-key" version of their accounting, CPA, and real estate management software. Shortly after the release of the Z-90, they released a 5MB hard disk unit and double-density external floppy disk drives, which were much more practical for business data storage than punched paper tapes.

While the H11 was popular with hard-core hobbyists, Heath engineers realized that DEC's low-end PDP-11 microprocessors would not be able to get Heath up the road to more powerful systems at an affordable price. Heath/Zenith then designed a dual Intel 8085/8088-based system dubbed the H100 (or Z-100, in preassembled form, sold by ZDS). The machine featured advanced (for the day) bit mapped video that allowed up to 640 x 225 pixels of 8 color graphics. The H100 was interesting in that it could run either the CP/M operating system, or their OEM version of MS-DOS named Z-DOS, which were the two leading business PC operating systems at the time. Although the machine had to be rebooted to change modes, the competing operating systems could read each other's disks.

In 1982 Heath introduced the Hero-1 robot kit to teach principles of industrial robotics. The robot included a Motorola 6808 processor, ultrasonic sensor, and optionally a manipulator arm; the complete robot could be purchased assembled for $2495 or a basic kit without the arm purchased for $999.  This was the first in a popular series of HeathKit robot kits sold to educational and hobbyist users.

Kit era comes to a close 
While Heath/Zenith's computer business was successful, the growing popularity of home computers as a hobby hurt the company because many customers began writing computer programs instead of assembling Heathkits. Also, while their assembly was still an interesting and educational hobby, kits were no longer less expensive than preassembled products; BYTE reported in 1984 that the kit version of the Z-150 IBM PC compatible cost $100 more than the preassembled computer from some dealers, but needed about 20 hours and soldering skills to assemble. The continuation of the integration trend (printed circuit boards, integrated circuits, etc.), and mass production of electronics (especially computer manufacturing overseas and plug-in modules) eroded the basic Heathkit business model. Assembling a kit might still be fun, but it could no longer save much money. The switch to surface mount components and LSI ICs finally made it impossible for the home assembler to construct an electronic device for significantly less money than assembly line factory products.

As sales of its kits dwindled during the decade, Heath relied on its training materials and a new venture in home automation and lighting products to stay afloat. When Zenith eventually sold ZDS to Groupe Bull in 1989, Heathkit was included in the deal.

In March 1992, Heath announced that it was discontinuing electronic kits after 45 years. The company had been the last sizable survivor of a dozen kit manufacturers from the 1960s. In 1995, Bull sold Heathkit to a private investor group called HIG, which then sold it to another investment group in 1998. Wanting to only concentrate on the educational products, this group sold the Heath/Zenith name and products to DESA International, a maker of specialty tools and heaters. In late 2008, Heathkit Educational Systems sold a large portion of its physical collection of legacy kit schematics and manuals along with permission to make reproductions to Don Peterson, though it still retained the copyrights and trademarks, and had pointers to people that could help with the older equipment.

DESA filed bankruptcy in December 2008.  The Heathkit company existed for a few years as Heathkit Educational Systems located in Saint Joseph, Michigan, concentrating on the educational market.  The Heathkit company filed for bankruptcy in 2012.

Revival
In May 2013, Heathkit's corporate restructuring was announced on their website. An extensive FAQ accessible from their homepage stated clearly that Heathkit was back, and that they would resume electronic kit production and sales.

On October 8, 2015, Heathkit circulated an email to its "insiders", who had indicated an interest in the company's progress by completing its online marketing survey. It had now secured the rights to all Heathkit designs and trademarks; secured several new patents; established new offices, warehouse space, and a factory in Santa Cruz, California; and had introduced the renewed company's first new electronic kit in decades. Since then, Heathkit has announced and sold further kits in its new lineup of products. In addition, limited repair service on vintage products, reprints of manuals and schematics, remaining inventories of original parts, and upgrades of some vintage models are available.

Amateur radio 

Heathkit made amateur radio kits almost from the beginning.  In addition to their low prices compared with commercially manufactured equipment, Heathkits appealed to amateurs who had an interest in building their own equipment, but did not necessarily have the expertise or desire to design it and obtain all the parts themselves. They expanded and enhanced their line of amateur radio gear through nearly four decades.  By the late 1960s, Heathkit had as large a selection of ham equipment as any company in the field.

Beginnings 
They entered the market in 1954 with the AT-1, a simple, three tube, crystal controlled transmitter.  It was capable of operating CW on the six most popular amateur short wave bands, and sold for $29.50.

The 39-page catalog contained only two pages of “ham gear”.  An antenna coupler was the only other piece of equipment specifically intended for amateur radio use.  The other two items were a general coverage short wave receiver, the AR-2, and an impedance meter. A VFO for the AT-1, the model VF-1, came out the following year.

Early DX-series transmitters 

The company's first full featured transmitter, the DX-100, appeared in 1956.  It filled two facing catalog pages, indicating Heathkit's seriousness in building kits for amateurs.  The description noted that it was “amateur designed” – meant to convey expertise in designing specifically for the amateur radio operator – not the usual sense of the term amateur.  And it stated that “amateurs in the field are enthusiastic about praising its performance under actual operating conditions”, indicating that it had been through what we would call beta testing today.

Heathkit had been including schematic diagrams of nearly every major kit in its catalog since 1954.  In addition, the DX-100's listing contained two interior pictures and a block diagram.  The 15-tube design could transmit either CW or AM (voice) with 100 to 140 watts output on all seven short wave amateur bands.  It had a built-in power supply and VFO, and weighed 100 pounds.  Priced at $189.50, it was expensive for the time, yet undercut other amateur transmitters having similar features.  It became quite popular.

The following year they introduced two scaled-down transmitters: the CW-only DX-20 model, meant for beginners, and the DX-35, capable of both CW and AM phone.  Both models covered six bands, only lacking the DX-100's coverage of the 160m (1.8 MHz) band.  Although they resembled the DX-100 in appearance, they lacked many of its features.  But at $35.95 and $56.95, they were much more affordable.  The DX-35 was superseded a year later by the improved DX-40.

The DX-100 was upgraded in 1959 to the DX-100B (there apparently was no DX-100A) and sold for the same price.  By 1960, the catalog advertised it as the “best watts per dollar value” and called the 5-year-old design “classic”.

Heathkit tribes

Apache, Mohawk, Chippewa, Seneca 
In 1959, a year before the last DX-100 was sold, a new deluxe line of amateur equipment was introduced.  The TX-1 Apache transmitter and the RX-1 Mohawk receiver were about the same size and weight as the DX-100 but had updated styling and a new cabinet (to which the DX-100 also changed).  The transmitter had many more features than its predecessor, and the RX-1 was Heathkit's first full featured amateur band receiver.

Both units used a "slide rule dial" with a scale on a rotating drum that changed with the band selection, and provided more accurate tuning.  Together, Heath's top-of-the-line pair sold for $504.45.

The SB-10 SSB adapter was introduced in 1959 to enable both the Apache and DX-100 to operate on the new mode.  The next year, a matching kilowatt linear amplifier, the KL-1 Chippewa, was added to the line.  Completing the line, the model VHF-1 Seneca covered the 6 meter (50 MHz) and 2 meter (144 MHz) bands.

Cheyenne, Comanche 
The MT-1 Cheyenne transmitter and MR-1 Comanche receiver were considerably smaller and lighter than the Apache-Mohawk pair.  Used with either an AC or DC external power supply, they could be operated in fixed or mobile service. Without transceive capability, this pair was probably challenging to operate while driving.  A year later these units were reborn as the HX-20 transmitter and HR-20 receiver (and were no longer given names), capable of SSB operation.

Marauder, Warrior 
The HX-10 Marauder was a redesigned replacement for the Apache, operating on SSB without an external adapter.  It appeared in the 1962–63 catalog along with a new linear amplifier, the HA-10 Warrior.

VHF 
The last new entry in the tribes generation was the HX-30 transmitter and HA-20 linear amplifier, both capable of SSB operation on the six meter (50 MHz) band.

Heathkit also brought out a pair of single band, low power, CW and AM phone VHF transceivers – the HW-10 and HW-20 for the 6 meter and 2 meter bands, respectively. Designed primarily for mobile use, they were much smaller than the tribes but bore a strong family resemblance down to their chrome knobs.

In 1961 they also brought out a distinctive set of low cost, compact, single band transceivers for 6 and 2 meters, the HW-29 and HW-30, also called the Sixer and Twoer.  Completely self-contained, with a built-in speaker and a matching microphone, they could operate from AC or DC power.  Somewhat limited in features, they were designed for AM phone operation only and frequency control was crystal controlled on transmit.

These portable transceivers looked distinctly different from other Heathkit gear.  Tan and brown rather than the pervasive green, they were roughly rectangular shaped with rounded corners and had a handle on top.  That particular shape and appearance would lead to them being dubbed the “Benton Harbor Lunchboxes” in the 1966 catalog.

New novice station 
 To succeed the DX-series that started in the 1950s, Heathkit designed an entirely new novice station consisting of the DX-60 transmitter, HR-10 receiver, and HG-10 VFO.  These matching units were smaller and lighter than the tribes, covered five bands, and were much lower priced.  They would go through incremental improvement and sell for more than a decade.  In 1969 Heathkit added the HW-16 to its beginner-level line – a transceiver designed specifically for the Novice licensee.  It covered the three HF Novice bands, CW only, and was crystal controlled but could be used with the HG-10 VFO.

SB-series and HW-series 
By the early 1960s, a large majority of amateurs had adopted SSB as their primary mode of voice communication on the HF bands.  This led to the development of equipment that was specifically designed for transceive operation on SSB, and also much smaller and lighter than the previous generation of ham gear.

As with other manufacturers, such as Drake and Collins, Heathkit began in 1964 by introducing a transceiver.  It covered only one band and came in three models: The HW-12, -22, and -32, covering the 20m (14 MHz), 40m (7 MHz) and 75m (3.8 MHz) bands, respectively.

Influenced heavily by the S/Line from Collins, Heathkit designed the SB-series to become their top-line set of amateur radio equipment.  Like the S/Line, these new products were designed to operate together in various combinations as a system. The first models appeared in the 1965 catalog, displacing the large, heavy units of the tribes generation (except for the Marauder and Warrior, and the 6 meter units which remained for one year).

When used together, the SB-300 receiver and SB-400 transmitter could transceive and had many other features of the S/Line, including crystal bandwidth filters and 1 kHz tuning dial resolution. They could also operate separately (if the optional crystal pack was installed in the transmitter), giving the operator more flexibility in communicating with foreign stations, aka "DX Stations", who were not authorized to transmit within the same frequency ranges as the U.S. stations were authorized to use. The S/Line influence was easy to see too, in its cabinet styling, tuning mechanism and knobs.  But by designing them as kits and using less expensive construction, Heathkit could offer these units at much lower prices.  The pair sold for $590 that same year.  The matching SB-200 1,200-watt input/700-800-watt output linear amplifier completed the line for 1965.

The following year two more units were added: the SB-110 transceiver for the 6 meter band and the HA-14 “Kompact Kilowatt”, a smaller kilowatt linear amplifier based on the SB-200. The HA-14 also used grounded grid 572Bs but with external AC and DC power supplies. At 7 lbs the amplifier itself was very small, matching the HW mono-banders in style, and usable in both mobile and desktop service. Like the SB-200 from which it derived, its input was designed to match the 100-watt output of the Heathkit SB and HW series plus as Collins and others.

In a last minute, four page, center insert to the 1966 catalog titled “New Product News” Heathkit announced the SB-100 five-band SSB transceiver. Like the other transceivers of this time, the SB-100 (and later improved models SB-101 and SB-102) would become one of Heathkit's best selling amateur radio products.  This included a scaled-back, lower-priced version of the SB-100 called the HW-100 (later updated to the HW-101) introduced in 1969. While the SB series were affectionately nicknamed the "Sugar Baker" series, the HW series were affectionately nicknamed the "Hot Water" series.

In the next three years, Heathkit brought out several more SB-series accessories, including a 2 kilowatt input/1.4 kilowatt output linear amplifier, the SB-220. The SB-400 model transmitter was slightly updated with the newer SB-401 model. The final model in the original SB-series was the SB-303 receiver, a solid state replacement (in a smaller case) for the SB-301 and its earlier sibling, the SB-300 receiver. The 2000 film Frequency, starring  Dennis Quaid and Jim Caviezel, featured a Heathkit SB-301 receiver being used with artistic license as a transceiver (film studio prop), although the SB-301 did not have any transmitter stages in it and was not a transceiver. An SB-302 receiver was never produced (no reason ever given for why the 302 model number was skipped) and some hams who worked at Heath hinted that there was talk of a solid state SB-103 transceiver, but it never made it past the proposal stage.

The SB-series would continue to be improved and sell well until 1974 and the arrival of solid state and digital design, with the SB-104 transceiver, its accessories and a new generation of amateur radio gear. Though somewhat redesigned physically it had a similar appearance to the earlier SB-series generation. The SB-670 was a short-lived dream antenna tuner that matched the SB-104. Unfortunately, only a few were produced and those were considered "prototypes". However, technical issues with the first production run of the SB-104 led to Heath having to quickly update it with the SB-104A. By that time, amateurs were buying transceivers made overseas being produced for the same amount of money with more features (including the AM and FM modes that the Heathkit SB and HW series did not have) and did not require user assembly.

In 1983 Heathkit came out with their last ham radio kit, the HW-5400 transceiver. It was all solid state with 100 watts output on 160 through 10 meters including the newly available WARC bands. Also available was a matching power supply.

Solid state and digital 
In the late 1970s Heathkit redesigned the line again, bringing out a series of transceivers and separates with more advanced digital features and new styling (abandoning the green motif, a distinguishing feature of Heathkits for more than two decades).

During the 1980s, with increasing competition primarily from Japanese equipment makers, wide use of automated manufacturing techniques, and increasingly complex designs, it became much more difficult to produce kits that were both easy to construct and feature-rich at a competitive price.  Heathkit began to introduce models that were unavailable in kit form such as the SS-9000. The SS-9000 is an all solid-state, synthesized transceiver covering 160 through 10 meters (including the WARC bands) with 100 watts output. A total of 375 were produced according to the Yahoo Heath user group. This continued until they left the electronic kit business in 1992. , the Heathkit company has been revived, and is offering both newly designed and vintage products for the amateur radio market.

See also 
 HERO (robot)
 History of personal computers
 Homebuilt aircraft
 Vintage amateur radio

References

Further reading

External links 

 
 Heathkit Virtual Museum
 Heathkit, at RigReference.com
 Heathkit Information, at Nostalgic Kits Central
 Heathkit 1967 vintage catalog; (archive copy)

 
Amateur radio companies
American companies established in 1926
American companies disestablished in 2012
Computer companies established in 1926
Computer companies disestablished in 2012
Audio equipment manufacturers of the United States
Electronic kit manufacturers
Electronic calculator companies
Companies based in Michigan
Electronics companies established in 1926
Companies disestablished in 2012
American brands
1926 establishments in Illinois
2012 disestablishments in Michigan
Defunct computer companies of the United States